Sarah Rice (died 1842), was an English businessperson.

She married Henry Rice, Captain of the British East Indies Company and the owner of a bank and a company which managed Homing pigeons. She was widowed in 1797, and became the manager and senior partner of the company and the bank of her late spouse, the Latham, Rice and Co (Samuel Latham, Sarah Rice and Henshaw Latham) in Dover. She was the managing director until 1811, when she retired in favor of her son Edward Royd Rice. Her pigeons reportedly brought the news of Napoleon's defeat at Waterloo to London.

Sarah Rice is known as one of the potential role models for the character of Mrs Norris in Mansfield Park by Jane Austen.

References

1842 deaths
18th-century English businesspeople
19th-century English businesspeople
18th-century English businesswomen
19th-century English businesswomen
English bankers
Women of the Regency era
Jane Austen